Ian Jeffry Robertson (born 26 November 1951) was a rugby union player who represented Australia.

Robertson, a wing, was born in Sydney and claimed a total of 2 international rugby caps for Australia. Robertson was also known by the nickname “Devil’s Elbow”.

References

Australian rugby union players
Australia international rugby union players
1951 births
Living people
Rugby union players from Sydney
Rugby union wings